Steppenwolf is an album of rock music produced and played by Peter Maffay, which was recorded in Germany and went on sale in 1979. It contains parts of his early work, and some of the music he recorded and played with peace activists / singers such as Donovan. The album topped the charts in Germany, staying there for 9 weeks and continued charting for over a year. The single, "So bist du", also hit No. 1, doing so for three weeks.

Track listing

Charts

Weekly charts

Year-end charts

Certifications and sales

References

External links 

 

1979 albums
Peter Maffay albums